The men's 1500 metres event at the 2009 Summer Universiade was held on 7–9 July.

Medalists

Results

Heats
Qualification: First 3 of each heat (Q) and the next 3 fastest (q) qualified for the final.

Final

References

Results (archived)

1500
2009